The 1903–04 collegiate men's basketball season in the United States began in December 1903, progressed through the regular season, and concluded in March 1904.

Season headlines 

 In February 1943, the Helms Athletic Foundation retroactively selected Columbia as its national champion for the 1903–04 season.
 In 1995, the Premo-Porretta Power Poll retroactively selected Columbia as its national champion for the 1903–04 season.

Conference membership changes

Regular season

Conference winners 

NOTE: The Western Conference (the future Big Ten Conference) did not sponsor an official conference season or recognize a regular-season champion until the 1905–06 season. In 1903–04, Chicago (7–0) finished with the best winning percentage (1.000) and Purdue (11–2) and Wisconsin (11–4) with the most wins.

Statistical leaders

Coaching changes

References